The Adidas Tango is a family and brand of association football balls originally introduced as the "Tango Durlast" in 1978, specifically for the 1978 FIFA World Cup in Argentina. Variations of the design had been produced for various competitions including the FIFA World Cup, the UEFA European Championship, and the football competition of the Summer Olympics.  The Tango balls have had different names applied to them to distinguish them in their construction, the competitions they have been used for, and even if they are official match balls or replica balls.

In 2011, Adidas introduced the new Tango 12 ball, but aside from the name there are no particular similarities between the new ball and the old Adidas Tango family.

Tango Durlast
The 1978 Tango Durlast consisted of twenty identical hexagonal panels with 'triads' creating the impression of 12 circles around the pentagons. The Adidas Tango Durlast ball was made of genuine leather with a shiny waterproof plastic coating.

Tango España
The Tango España by Adidas was the official match ball of 1982 FIFA World Cup held in Spain. The Tango España had improved water resistant qualities through its rubberized seams.  These proved to be not very durable and resulted in the ball having to be changed several times during some games.  This ball was the last genuine leather ball to be used in the World Cup.

Tango variations

Other variations of the Tango ball seen include: Tango Roma, Tango Napoli, Tango Munich, Tango Scorpion, Tango Mendoza, Tango Gol, Tango Indoor Ball, Tango Tournoi

Use in heraldry
Adidas Tango ball is featured on the club badge of Ukrainian club Chornomorets Odessa, as well as Russian football team Mordovia Saransk.

See also
 Adidas Tango 12

References

External links

 Tango balls on Adidas website
 Adidas ball history
 Soccerball World: History of the World Cup's Match Balls
The Guardian - The Joy of Six: great footballs
 The History of FIFA World Cup Match Ball

Tango
Products introduced in 1978
FIFA World Cup balls
1978 FIFA World Cup
1982 FIFA World Cup
UEFA Euro 1980
UEFA Euro 1984
UEFA Euro 1988
UEFA European Championship balls
Olympic football balls